Päivätär is the goddess of the Sun in Finnish mythology. She owns the silver of the Sun, spins silver yarns, and weaves clothes out of them. In Kalevala, young maidens ask Päivätär to give them some of her silver jewellery and clothes. She is described as a great beauty.

Professor Anna-Leena Siikala finds it possible that Päivätär was a goddess who ruled over life and light. During Christian period, she was replaced by Virgin Mary.

In Finnish folk poetry, Päivätär is known as the mother of wasps. Another name which appears in folk poetry is Auringotar, which has the same meaning as Päivätär. Auringotar is mentioned as the creator of fire.

See also
 List of solar deities

References

Finnish goddesses
Solar goddesses